Walpole is a small census-designated place (CDP) located within the much larger town (21 square miles in size) of Walpole in Norfolk County, Massachusetts, United States.  Walpole Town as it is called by the US Census Bureau, also includes a much larger population (24,070 in 2010). The population of the Census Designated Place was 5,918 at the 2010 census.

Geography
Walpole is located at  (42.140417, -71.246421).

According to the United States Census Bureau, the CDP has a total area of 7.5 km (2.9 mi). 7.4 km (2.9 mi) of it is land and 0.2 km (0.1 mi) of it (2.06%) is water.

Demographics

As of the census of 2000, there were 5,867 people, 2,478 households, and 1,615 families residing in the CDP. The population density was 792.0/km (2,054.7/mi). There were 2,537 housing units at an average density of 342.5/km (888.5/mi). The racial makeup of the CDP was 96.71% White, 0.78% Black or African American, 0.07% Native American, 1.53% Asian, 0.02% Pacific Islander, 0.15% from other races, and 0.73% from two or more races. Hispanic or Latino of any race were 0.94% of the population.

There were 2,478 households, out of which 26.8% had children under the age of 18 living with them, 53.1% were married couples living together, 9.8% had a female householder with no husband present, and 34.8% were non-families. 31.2% of all households were made up of individuals, and 13.6% had someone living alone who was 65 years of age or older. The average household size was 2.37 and the average family size was 3.00.

In the CDP, the population was spread out, with 22.7% under the age of 18, 4.6% from 18 to 24, 29.4% from 25 to 44, 24.4% from 45 to 64, and 18.9% who were 65 years of age or older. The median age was 41 years. For every 100 females, there were 87.9 males. For every 100 females age 18 and over, there were 83.1 males.

The median income for a household in the CDP was $59,744, and the median income for a family was $74,535. Males had a median income of $53,110 versus $35,833 for females. The per capita income for the CDP was $29,669. About 1.8% of families and 3.1% of the population were below the poverty line, including 1.5% of those under age 18 and 6.9% of those age 65 or over.

References

Census-designated places in Norfolk County, Massachusetts
Census-designated places in Massachusetts